Khtzkonk Monastery (also transcribed as Khtskonk and Xc'konk') was a monastic ensemble of five Armenian churches built between the seventh and thirteenth centuries in what was then the Armenian Bagratid kingdom. The site is located near the town of Digor, the administrative capital of the Digor district of the Kars Province in Turkey, about 19 kilometres west of the border with Armenia, in a gorge formed by the Digor River.

Present condition
The monastery with its five churches was intact when photographed by the Armenian archaeologist Ashkharbek Kalantar in August 1920, just before Turkey captured the region from Armenia. In 1959 the French art historian Jean-Michel Thierry visited the site and found that four of the five churches had been destroyed, with only the Church of Saint Sargis surviving. While historian Thomas Sinclair in 1987 ventured an explanation that the buildings were destroyed by "rolling rocks," others, including locals themselves, have attested that the churches were blown up by the Turkish army using high explosive rounds, which was reaffirmed by the residents of Digor in 2002. Their information is corroborated by the physical evidence on the site which "seems to confirm that these buildings were intentionally destroyed with modern, probably military means" as part of "a phenomenon that could be defined as cultural genocide." The dome of the surviving church is intact but the side walls have been blown outwards; the destroyed churches have been entirely leveled with their masonry blasted into the gorge below. This is damage that cannot have occurred as a result of an earthquake, William Dalrymple wrote similarly in 1989.

Gallery

Notes

External links 

 The Monastery օf Khtzkonk on VirtualAni.org
 Gagik Arzumanyan's photo gallery
 Image gallery of Khtzkonk at Research on Armenian Architecture's website
 Images from 1968 at the Gateway to Armenian Cultural Heritage website

Armenian churches in Turkey
Christian monasteries established in the 7th century
Oriental Orthodox congregations established in the 7th century
Buildings and structures demolished in the 1950s
Destroyed churches in Turkey
Demolished buildings and structures in Turkey
Churches destroyed by Muslims
Armenian buildings in Turkey
7th-century churches in Turkey